Fosters Freeze is a chain of fast-food restaurants in California. Its first location, on La Brea Avenue in Inglewood, California, was opened by George Foster in 1946 and is still operating.

The chain's name refers to its soft-serve ice milk and milkshakes. Its marketing slogan is "California's Original Soft Serve." Its mascot is Little Foster, a smiling ice cream cone.

History

George Foster moved to California after World War II to open outlets for Dairy Queen, since he owned the development rights in the state. However, state laws protecting the dairy industry prevented the use of “dairy” in restaurant names. So instead, in 1946, Foster opened a restaurant named after himself, Foster’s Old Fashion Freeze. (The apostrophe was later dropped.) In 1951, he sold the chain's 360 locations for $1 million. By 1987, it had been reduced to 189 locations.

El Pollo Loco signed a master franchise contract with Fosters Freeze in 1994, allowing service of Fosters Freeze soft-serve ice cream in El Pollo Loco locations. In 2002, 163 El Pollo Loco locations sold Fosters Freeze products, and their overall sales increased by three to six percent. The contract ended in 2014.

The historical significance of Fosters Freeze restaurants attracts patrons and has united community members to preserve them. In 2006, residents of Menlo Park presented their city council a petition with about 400 signatures to prevent the demolition of their local Fosters, although it finally closed in 2015. The Santa Cruz location is listed in the city's historic building survey.

In 2015, a restaurant franchise investment group bought Fosters Freeze. It modernized the brand and operations; sales have increased every year since then. As of 2021, the company plans to add locations for the first time since 2006.

As of December 2021, there are 66 Fosters Freeze locations, all in California.

In popular culture
 The Beach Boys song "Fun, Fun, Fun" was inspired by the Fosters Freeze location in Hawthorne, California.
 The Fosters Freeze in Atwater Village, Los Angeles appeared in the movie Pulp Fiction.

References

External links

1946 establishments in California
Restaurants established in 1946
Fast-food chains of the United States
Fast-food poultry restaurants
Fast-food franchises
Ice cream parlors in the United States
Companies based in San Bernardino County, California
Inglewood, California
Regional restaurant chains in the United States